There are 30 association football teams in the top two tiers of Belgian football, all of whom have a manager, although the terms head coach and trainer are more commonly used for the position. The Belgian Pro League and Challenger Pro League are the only fully professional football leagues in Belgium. The Belgian Pro League consists of 18 clubs at the top of the Belgian football league system, while 12 clubs play in the second tier.

Some of these managers were appointed as caretaker managers prior to being given a permanent position; if so their caretaker appointment date is denoted in italics. Some managers listed have had more than one spell in charge at their current club, however their time as manager is counted only from the date of their last appointment.

Managers

Notes

References 

Belgian Professional Football